Making the Grade is an American sitcom which aired on CBS from April 5 until May 10, 1982. It starred James Naughton, Graham Jarvis, Alley Mills, Steven Peterman, and boasted the first TV series roles for Philip Charles MacKenzie and George Wendt. It was set at Franklin High School in St. Louis, and aired as a part of CBS' Monday night comedy lineup. The theme song was a modified version of Tom Scott's "Heading Home", which appeared on his Street Beat album three years earlier.

The quick cancellation of Making The Grade allowed series co-star George Wendt the opportunity to star in the series Cheers, which began airing just four months after the final episode of Making The Grade was broadcast.   As well, series creator Gary David Goldberg's next series was the substantial hit Family Ties; it too began airing four months after the cancellation of Making The Grade.

Cast
 James Naughton as Harry Barnes (Dean of Boys)
 Graham Jarvis as Assistant Principal Jack Felspar
 Alley Mills as Sara Conover (drama teacher)
 Steven Peterman as Jeff Keitan
 Zane Lasky as Anton Zemeckis
 George Wendt as Gus Bertoia (physical education teacher)
 Philip Charles MacKenzie as David Wasserman
 Veronica Redd as Janice Reeves

US television ratings

</onlyinclude>

Episodes

References

External links
 

1982 American television series debuts
1982 American television series endings
1980s American high school television series
1980s American sitcoms
1980s American workplace comedy television series
CBS original programming
English-language television shows
Television series about educators
Television series by CBS Studios
Television shows set in St. Louis
Television shows set in Missouri